Khatunabad Rural District may refer to:
 Khatunabad Rural District (Jiroft County)
 Khatunabad Rural District (Shahr-e Babak County)